Christian Attah Gyan (2 November 1978 – 29 December 2021) was a Ghanaian professional footballer who played as a defender.

Club career
Gyan was born in Tema, Ghana on 2 November 1978. Playing for Ghapoha, he signed for Feyenoord in 1996. During the following season he moved on loan to Excelsior. After only a couple of months Feyenoord recalled the defender, and he made his debut for Feyenoord that same season. Gyan remained with Feyenoord for the next eight seasons. He was mainly used as a substitute. Gyan did play the 2002 UEFA Cup Final against Borussia Dortmund. He replaced the suspended Brett Emerton in the starting eleven. With Gyan, Feyenoord went on to beat Dortmund 3–2. While at Feyenoord Gyan also won a Dutch League Championship and a Johan Cruijff Schaal. Gyan was one of the most popular players at Feyenoord, always gaining a big applause from the fans when he started his warming-up.

In June 2008 Gyan completed a successful trial for the Finnish club Turun Palloseura, and he signed a six-month deal with TPS on 3 June. In January 2009 Gyan signed for Wrexham until the end of the 2008–09 season, but made only two appearances for the club in the FA Trophy before being released at the end of the season.
He signed a contract for RoPS in February 2010. In July, he got released by the club because of knee injury that happened in February. Gyan did not make any appearances for RoPS.
He finished his career at amateur side RKSV Leonidas in Rotterdam.

International career
Gyan played seven games at the 1997 FIFA World Youth Championship, where Ghana finished fourth.

His full international debut, incidentally, came against the Netherlands. For the senior side he featured eight times between 1998 and 2001, including at the 2000 Africa Cup of Nations.

Personal life and death
Gyan was diagnosed with terminal cancer in November 2021. He died from the disease a month later on 29 December 2021, at the age of 43.

Honours
Feyenoord
UEFA Cup: 2001–02
Eredivisie: 1998-99
Johan Cruyff Shield: 1999

References

External links

FIFA Player Statistics: Christian Gyan

1978 births
2021 deaths
People from Tema
Association football defenders
Ghanaian footballers
Ghana under-20 international footballers
Ghana international footballers
2000 African Cup of Nations players
Ghapoha Readers players
Excelsior Rotterdam players
Feyenoord players
Turun Palloseura footballers
Rovaniemen Palloseura players
UEFA Cup winning players
Eredivisie players
Eerste Divisie players
Veikkausliiga players
Wrexham A.F.C. players
RKSV Leonidas players
Ghanaian expatriate footballers
Expatriate footballers in the Netherlands
Ghanaian expatriate sportspeople in the Netherlands
Expatriate footballers in Finland
Ghanaian expatriate sportspeople in Finland
Expatriate footballers in Wales
Ghanaian expatriate sportspeople in Wales